Northanger Abbey is a 1987 made-for-television film adaptation of Jane Austen's 1817 novel Northanger Abbey, and was originally broadcast on the A&E Network and the BBC on 15 February 1987. It is part of the Screen Two anthology series.

Plot 
The film is set in the late 18th century, when Jane Austen wrote the novel although it was published after her death in 1817. Northanger Abbey is the story of a young woman, Catherine Morland, who is invited to Bath, Somerset, with family friends, the Allens; they hope that the waters at Bath will help Mr. Allen's gout. Catherine (called "Cathy" by her many younger siblings) is a 17-year-old young lady who has been quite sheltered all her life, escaping only by reading Gothic novels, and so is delighted to go to Bath. Mrs. Allen introduces Catherine to the Thorpe family, including an older girl, Isabella, who befriends Catherine. The girls have bonded over their love of similar novels when their brothers arrive. James (Catherine's brother) falls in love with Isabella, who is a hardened flirt. Likewise, John (Isabella's brother and James's friend) pursues Catherine, who does not like John nearly as much as John likes himself.

Catherine is falling in love with a quirky 26-year-old clergyman, Henry Tilney, whom she met at a dance. She befriends Henry's sister, Eleanor, and goes on many outings with the two of them, after their brother Frederick Tilney comes to Bath. Isabella, having learned that James (to whom she is now engaged) is poor, begins to flirt with Frederick and ultimately ends her engagement with James. Eleanor invites Catherine to stay with her at the Tilneys' home, Northanger Abbey.

Catherine accepts the invitation with pleasure, although she imagines that the Abbey will be rather like one of the gloomy castles in her books. Catherine is at first welcomed by General Tilney (Henry's father), who has been bragged to by John Thorpe that Catherine (whom John thinks is in love with him) is an heiress. When the General realizes that Catherine is not rich, however, he sends her packing. Once back at home, Catherine is unhappy, missing Henry and disillusioned about her precious Gothic novels. Henry appears and proposes, however, and the story ends happily.

Cast 
 Katharine Schlesinger as Catherine Morland
 Peter Firth as Henry Tilney
 Robert Hardy as General Tilney
 Googie Withers as Mrs. Allen
 Geoffrey Chater as Mr. Allen
 Cassie Stuart as Isabella Thorpe
 Jonathan Coy as John Thorpe
 Ingrid Lacey as Eleanor Tilney
 Greg Hicks as Frederick Tilney
 Philip Bird as James Morland
 Elvi Hale as Mrs. Thorpe
 Helen Fraser as Mrs. Morland
 David Rolfe as Mr. Morland
 Elaine Ives-Cameron as Marchioness
 Angela Curran as Alice
 Tricia Morrish as Miss Digby
 Oliver Hembrough as Edward Morland
 Anne-Marie Mullane as Thorpe Sisters
 Michelle Arthur as Thorpe Sisters
 Sarah-Jane Holm as Jenny
 Raphael Alleyne as page boy

References

External links 

 
 Northanger Abbey at PBS.org
 

BBC television dramas
Films based on works by Jane Austen
Films set in the 18th century
Films set in Bath, Somerset
1987 television films
British television films
Films directed by Giles Foster
Northanger Abbey